Rudhra is a 1991 Tamil-language comedy thriller film written by Ilavarasan and directed by Sasi Mohan. It stars K. Bhagyaraj, Gautami and Lakshmi. The film was one among the Deepavali releases of 1991. The bank robbery scenes of the movie were inspired from that of the Hollywood movie Quick Change (1990). The core plot of the movie was inspired from the French film Nikita.

Plot
Mayaandi, a dreaded criminal, escapes from prison and guns down Rudhra's entire family. Rudhra learns the truth but the police can do nothing because Mayaandi returns to jail after the murder and has an alibi. She receives a letter her police officer father, sent before his death. He uncovered links between Mayaandi and several powerful prominent people—including police officers and politicians. Rudhra discovers a video cassette with the proof and gives it to the DSP only to discover he is part of the cabal. He attacks Rudhra and she kills him in self-defence. The police arrest her and the incorruptible DSP Lalitha investigates the case. The cabal again pursues Rudhra upon realizing that the video cassette they took from her was not the incriminating one. She doesn't know the location of the original cassette but shares the entire story with Lalitha. The two women collaborate when they realize the police department can't be trusted. They also bring in thief Madurai to help them uncover the conspiracy.

Cast
K. Bhagyaraj as Madurai 
Gautami as Rudhra
Lakshmi as DSP Lalitha
Mansoor Ali Khan as Kedi Mayandi
Senthamarai as DSP
Delhi Ganesh as DCP Sundararajan
Nalinikanth as ACP Mohan
Kamala Kamesh as Rudhra's neighbor
T. S. Raghavendar as Rudhra's father
Major Sundarrajan as Judge (guest appearance)

Music
The music was composed by Gangai Amaran. The lyrics were written by Vaali and Gangai Amaran.
"Vittu Vittu" - S. P. Balasubrahmanyam, K. S. Chithra
"Enrootu" - SPB
"Aadadu" - K. S. Chithra

Reception
The Indian Express wrote the film "beguiles you [..] with its quickpaced narration". Sundarji of Kalki wrote "despite having so many opportunities for providing thrills and twists, is this how you ruin them ?"..It faced Heavy competition from Thalapathi, Gunaa and Bramma

Legacy
Sasi Mohan later made a similar themed film Sivantha Malar inspired from Nikita again with Gauthami in lead role.

References

1991 films
1990s Tamil-language films
Fictional portrayals of the Tamil Nadu Police
Films set in prison
Indian crime thriller films
Indian crime comedy films
1990s crime comedy films